Anolis aurifer is a species of lizard in the family Dactyloidae. The species is found in Hispaniola.

References

Anoles
Reptiles described in 1968
Taxa named by Albert Schwartz (zoologist)